In December 1832, two naval vessels were sent by the United Kingdom to re-assert British sovereignty over the Falkland Islands, after the United Provinces of the Rio de la Plata (part of which later became Argentina) ignored British diplomatic protests over the appointment of Luis Vernet as governor of the Falkland Islands and a dispute over fishing rights.

Background

In 1765, Captain John Byron explored Saunders Island, which lies 1.5 miles (2.5 km) off the coast of West Falkland. He named the harbour Port Egmont, and claimed this and other islands for Britain, on the grounds of prior discovery.  The next year Captain John MacBride established a British settlement at Port Egmont. Independently France had established in 1764 a colony at Port Louis, which it handed over to Spain in 1767.

The British presence in the west continued, until interrupted by Spain, during the Falkland Crisis from 10 July 1770 to 22 January 1771. Economic pressures led Britain to unilaterally withdraw from many overseas settlements in 1774, and they left Port Egmont on 20 May 1774, leaving a plaque asserting their continuing sovereignty over the islands. A few years later, under orders from Madrid, the Spanish demolished the settlement at Port Egmont and removed the plaque.  The Spanish settlement was itself withdrawn in 1811.

The islands remained an important outpost for whalers and sealers who used the islands to shelter from the worst of the South Atlantic weather. By merit of their location, the Falkland Islands have often been the last refuge for ships damaged at sea. Most numerous among those using the islands were British and American sealers, where typically between 40 and 50 ships were engaged in hunting fur seals.

In 1823, after its war of independence against Spain, the United Provinces granted land on East Falkland to Luis Vernet, who first travelled to the islands the following year. That first expedition failed almost as soon as it landed, and a second attempt, in 1826, sanctioned by the British (but delayed until winter by a Brazilian blockade), also failed after arrival in the islands. In 1828, the United Provinces government granted Vernet all of East Falkland, including all its resources, with exemption from taxation if a colony could be established within three years. He took settlers, some of them British, and before leaving once again sought permission first from the British Consulate in Buenos Aires. After receiving consent, Vernet agreed to provide regular reports to the British consul and expressed the desire for British protection for his settlement should they decide to re-establish their presence in the islands.

On Vernet's return to the Falklands, Puerto Soledad was renamed Puerto Luis. The United Provinces proclaimed Luis Vernet as governor of the islands in 1829. British diplomatic protests at the appointment and declarations of sovereignty were ignored. The United Provinces also granted Vernet exclusive rights to seal hunting in the islands. This too was disputed by the British and US consulates at Buenos Aires but once again the diplomatic protests were ignored. Vernet continued to provide regular reports to the British consul throughout this period.

In 1831, Luis Vernet with his newly created authority, used the services of a Captain Brisbane in the ship Betsy to capture three US vessels (Breakwater, Superior and Harriet) that were hunting seals in Falklands waters. The Breakwater escaped but the catch of the other two ships was confiscated and their crews were arrested. Vernet returned to the mainland, bringing senior officers of the US vessels to stand trial for violating restrictions on seal hunting. The US consul protested violently against the seizure of US ships and the USS Lexington sailed to the Falklands. The log of the Lexington reports only the destruction of arms and a powder store, though in his claim against the US government for compensation (rejected by the US government of President Grover Cleveland in 1885) Vernet stated that the settlement was destroyed. The islands were declared free from all government, the seven senior members of the settlement were arrested for piracy and taken to Montevideo, where they were released without charge on the orders of Commodore Rogers.

This latter incident finally convinced the British Foreign Office to reassert its sovereignty claim over the islands. Throughout much of 1832, the United Provinces did not have a government representative in the islands. The Buenos Aires government commissioned Major Esteban Mestivier as the new governor of the islands, to set up a penal colony, but when he arrived at the settlement on 15 November 1832 his soldiers mutinied and killed him. The mutiny was put down by Major José María Pinedo, commander of the United Provinces schooner Sarandí. Order was restored just before the British arrived.

Arrival of the squadron
Under the command of Captain John James Onslow, the brig-sloop HMS Clio, previously stationed at Rio de Janeiro, reached Port Egmont on 20 December 1832. It was later joined by HMS Tyne. Their first actions were to repair the fort at Port Egmont and affix a notice of possession.

Onslow arrived at Puerto Louis on 2 January 1833. Pinedo sent an officer to the British ship, where he was presented with the following written request to replace the Argentine flag with the British one, and leave the location.

Pinedo entertained plans for resisting, but finally desisted because of his obvious numerical inferiority and the want of enough nationals among his crew (approximately 80% of his forces were British mercenaries who refused to fight their countrymen). The British forces disembarked on 3 January and switched the flags, delivering the Argentine one to Pinedo, who left on 5 January.

Recognising Vernet's settlement had British permission, Onslow set about ensuring the continuation of that settlement for the replenishment of passing ships. The gauchos had not been paid since Vernet's departure and were anxious to return to the mainland. Onslow persuaded them to stay by paying them in silver for provisions and promising that in the absence of Vernet's authority they could earn their living from the feral cattle on the islands.

The British vessels did not stay long and departed two days later, leaving William Dickson (Vernet's storekeeper) in charge of the settlement. Dickson was provided with a flagpole and instructed to fly the British flag whenever a vessel was in harbour.

Argentina claims that the population of the islands was expelled in 1833; however, both British and Argentine sources from the time, including the log of the ARA Sarandí, suggest that the colonists were encouraged to remain under Vernet's deputy, Matthew Brisbane.

Aftermath

HMS Beagle arrived on 15 March 1833. Vernet dispatched his deputy Matthew Brisbane to the islands to take charge of his settlement March 1833. Meeting with Captain Fitzroy of the Beagle, he was encouraged to continue with Vernet's enterprise provided there was no attempt to further the ambitions of the United Provinces. Like Onslow before him, Fitzroy was forced to use his powers of persuasion to encourage the gauchos to continue working in Vernet's establishment:

Arriving in the Falklands, Fitzroy expected to find the thriving settlement reported by another British officer. Instead, he found the settlement in a derelict state, which Brisbane blamed upon the Lexington'''s raid. Fitzroy questioned several members of the settlement who corroborated Brisbane's account:

On departing from the islands Fitzroy expressed his concern for the settlement with its lack of regular authority in a virtually lawless group of islands.

On 26 August 1833, eight members of the settlement led by Antonio Rivero ran amok, killing the five senior members. In part this stemmed from the re-imposition of paying the wages of the gauchos in paper vouchers issued by Vernet.

In 1834 on his second visit Charles Darwin commented that:

Lieutenant Henry Smith was installed as the first British resident in January 1834; he immediately set about establishing British authority, arresting the murderers. The United Kingdom has held the territory ever since but for a two-month period after the 1982 invasion, during the Falklands War.

In Buenos Aires, Vernet was effectively bankrupt and attempts to obtain compensation from the US Government for losses from the Lexington'' raid proved fruitless. The situation in Buenos Aires was chaotic and diplomatic relations with the US remained ruptured till 1839. He made several approaches to the British Government asking for support to re-establish his business at Port Louis, receiving support from Woodbine Parish (British chargé d'affaires in Buenos Aires from 1825 to 1832) as the best qualified person to develop the islands.

Vernet wrote to Lieutenant Smith offering advice, which was gratefully received and acted upon. Smith repeatedly urged Vernet to return to Port Louis but as Vernet became increasingly involved in the territorial dispute with the government in Buenos Aires all communications ceased and no more accounts were sent. An approach to Lieutenant Robert Lowcay, who had succeeded Lieutenant Smith as British resident, to retrieve his property was rebuffed but later he was requested to remove his property as the British government could not be responsible for it.

References

Bibliography 
 
 
 
 
 

1833 in the Falkland Islands
Battles and conflicts without fatalities
Conflicts in 1833
Falkland Islands sovereignty dispute
History of the Falkland Islands
Falkland